Montford Scott (b. in Norfolk, England; executed at Fleet Street, London, on 2 July 1591) was an English Roman Catholic priest. He is a Catholic martyr, beatified in 1987.

Life

He went to Douai College in 1574, as one of the earliest seminary students there, and studied theology. The next year he was made subdeacon, and accompanied Dominic Vaughan to England.

In Essex they fell into the hands of the Government, December 1576, and under examination, Vaughan gave the names of Catholics both in London and Essex. They were then handed over by the Privy Council to the Archbishop of Canterbury for further examination, but nothing more was elicited, and they were afterwards set at liberty.

Scott returned to Douai on 22 May 1577, and having been ordained priest at Brussels set out for the English mission on 17 June. The vessel in which he crossed to England was attacked by pirates, but he escaped with some loss of his goods. In 1578, he was captured at Cambridge and sent to London by the University's Vice-Chancellor "with all such books, letters, writings, and other trash which were taken about them", but eventually released. He is mentioned as having laboured in Kent (1580), Norfolk, Suffolk (1583), Lincolnshire and Yorkshire (1584). On 24 April 1584, John Nedeham and others were indicted at Norwich for having, on 1 June 1582, received blessed beads from him.

In 1584 he was captured at York at brought to London, where he remained a prisoner for seven years. His release was procured by a money payment of one Baker, on condition of his leaving the country, but Richard Topcliffe immediately procured his re-arrest.

Meanwhile he had visited the Catholics in Wisbech Castle. He was brought to trial at the sessions at Newgate, with George Beesley (30 June 1591), and was condemned on account of his priesthood and of his being in the country contrary to the statute. The next day he was drawn to Fleet Street, where he was executed.

References

Attribution

1591 deaths
16th-century English Roman Catholic priests
English beatified people
16th-century venerated Christians
Eighty-five martyrs of England and Wales
Year of birth unknown